Erebuni State Reserve, is nature protected area of Armenia located in the capital Yerevan, located around 8 km southeast of the centre of the city in the District of Erebuni. It was formed in 1981. At a height between 1300 and 1450 meters above sea level, the reserve occupies an area of 120 hectares, mainly consisted of semi-deserted mountains-steppe.

The reserve was formed to protect the wild types of Poaceae, including the Triticum araraticum. Many of the protected species are included in the Red Book of Armenia.

It also has many other protected and endemic plant species, including Iris elegantissima.

The reserve is also home to many types of amphibians, including Pelobates syriacus, marsh frog and European green toad. Many types of rodents are also found in the reserve.

See also 
List of protected areas of Armenia
Geography of Armenia

References 

Protected areas of Armenia